Pterospathodus is an extinct genus of conodont from the Silurian period.

Use in stratigraphy 
The Telychian (Late Llandovery) of Estonia can be defined by five conodont zones (Pterospathodus eopennatus ssp. n. 1, P. eopennatus ssp. n. 2, P. amorphognathoides angulatus, P. a. lennarti and P. a. lithuanicus).

The Sheinwoodian (Wenlock) is defined between the acritarch biozone 5 and the last appearance of Pterospathodus amorphognathoides. The global boundary stratotype point is in Hughley Brook in Apedale, U.K.

References

External links 

 
 

Ozarkodinida genera
Silurian conodonts
Paleozoic life of Ontario
Paleozoic life of Quebec